The Swedish Armed Forces have an extensive history, during which it has undergone changes in both the equipment and military uniforms it uses. 

The present combat uniforms used by the Swedish military uses the M90 camouflage pattern. The M90 uniform is the standard combat and field uniform worn by the military of Sweden.

Combat uniforms

Earlier uniforms

 Swedish standard uniform model 1693.
 Model m/23.
 Model m/45.
 Model m/70.
 Model m/39 (wool).
 Model m/58 (wool).
 Model m/59 (cotton).

M90 

The M90 uniform consists of a field jacket (fältjacka), field trousers (fältbyxa), a field cap (fältmössa), and a helmet cover (hjälmdok). Other items issued as part of the field uniform include a  green quarter-zip thermal shirt, a combat vest, balaclava, a white winter over-suit, and black leather combat boots.

These items are produced in the M90 pattern in three schemes, woodland, snow, and desert; although the snow camouflage is only issued to specific units. The desert camouflage has been in use with the Swedish ISAF contingent in Afghanistan since 2004.

Variants

The basic field uniform has a number of variations beyond the standard field, desert and winter uniforms.
 2002 ADYK - a special operations forces uniform
 M90H (Helikopter) - a specialised uniform designed for helicopter crews, made from a fire-resistant material. M90H jackets reverse to orange for use as an emergency signaling panel in the event of a crash over land or sea.
 M90K (Ökenkamo) - a camouflage uniform designed for use in desert environments. It has been on issue to troops of the Swedish ISAF contingent from 2004 onward. It contains the standard M90 splinter pattern, recoloured for use in a desert environment. M90K has earth brown, light green and medium gray splinters on a sand-coloured background.
 M90L (Lätt/Light) - a uniform in the same pattern as the original M90, made in a lighter-weight material for personnel operating in climates warmer than Sweden.
 M90P (Pansar) - a special uniform for armoured units and tank regiments (Pansarregemente). This uniform has more pockets, has added padding to protect against the sharp corners in armoured vehicles, and is fireproof.
 M90T (Tropical) - a newer uniform designed to replace M90L uniforms, made from a lightweight ripstop cotton material. It is similar in construction to the M90K desert uniform.

References

External links

Military equipment of Sweden
Military uniforms
Swedish Army